Fluperolone is a synthetic glucocorticoid corticosteroid which was never marketed. An acetate ester of fluperolone, fluperolone acetate, in contrast, has been marketed.

References

Diketones
Fluoroarenes
Glucocorticoids
Pregnanes
Triols